Tytherington is a small village in Wiltshire, in the southwest of England. Most of the village is now part of the civil parish of Heytesbury although a few houses in the west are within the parish of Sutton Veny.

John Marius Wilson's Imperial Gazetteer of England and Wales (1870-1872) said of Tytherington: 

The small Anglican Church of St James is Grade II* listed. A church was founded here in the early 12th century but the present building is mainly from the 16th, and was restored in 1891 by C.E. Ponting. It has always been a chapel of St Peter and St Paul at Heytesbury; it has no graveyard. Today the parish is served by the Upper Wylye Valley team ministry.

Manor Farmhouse, at the north entrance to the village, is a 4-bay 2-storey house from the early 18th century, extended and altered in the 19th. In the Sutton Veny part of the village, Ashbys (formerly Tytherington Farmhouse) carries a date of 1771; nearby are a dovecote dated 1810 and a granary and stable of similar date.

Tytherington Down is a biological Site of Special Scientific Interest.

References

External links
 Heytesbury parish at Wiltshire Community History
 Parish of Heytesbury, Imber, Knook and Tytherington

Hamlets in Wiltshire